Knoyle is a surname. Notable people with the surname include:

Kyle Knoyle (born 1996), English footballer
Tavis Knoyle (born 1990), Welsh rugby union footballer